Comunisti col Rolex is a collaborative album by Italian hip hop artists J-Ax and Fedez, released in January 2017 by Sony Music Italy and Newtopia.

The album was preceded by the singles "Vorrei ma non posto", which became a hit during the summer of 2016, and "Assenzio", released in November 2016. "Piccole cose" was released as the album's third single on 20 January 2017, while "Senza pagare", featuring T-Pain, was released as the album's fourth single on 20 May 2017.

Track listing

Charts

Weekly charts

Year-end charts

Certifications

References

2017 albums
Collaborative albums
Fedez albums
Italian-language albums
J-Ax albums
Sony Music Italy albums
Rolex